Bournemouth Central or Central Bournemouth is a ward in Bournemouth, Dorset. Since 2019, the ward has elected 2 councillors to Bournemouth, Christchurch and Poole Council.

History 
The ward was formerly used for elections to Bournemouth Borough Council, which it elected three councillors.

Geography 
The ward includes Bournemouth Town Centre and Richmond Hill.

Demographics 
Bournemouth is the most ethnically diverse wards in Bournemouth. There are significant percentages of residents working in the wholesale and retail trade and hotels and catering and financial and insurance industries.

Councillors

Election results

2015 
Bournemouth Central reelected the 3 conservative councillors at the 2015 Bournemouth Borough Council election.

2019

References

External links 

 Listed Buildings in Central Ward, Bournemouth

Bournemouth Borough Council elections
Wards of Bournemouth, Christchurch and Poole